7K or 7-K may refer to: 

 7000 (number)
 The year 7000, in the 7th millennium
Gnome-Rhône 7K
Soyuz 7K-L1
Soyuz 7K-L1 No.4L 
Soyuz 7K-L1 No.5L
Soyuz 7K-L3
Soyuz 7K-OK
Soyuz 7K-OKS
Soyuz 7K-T
Progress 7K-TG
Soyuz 7K-TM
A-7K, model of LTV A-7 Corsair II
7K, model of Toyota K engine
7K, the production code for the 1988 Doctor Who serial Silver Nemesis

See also
K7 (disambiguation)